Dodești is a commune in Vaslui County, Western Moldavia, Romania. It is composed of two villages, Dodești and Urdești. These were part of Viișoara Commune until 2004, when they were split off.

References

Communes in Vaslui County
Localities in Western Moldavia